Stimpson is a surname, and may refer to:

 Sandy Stimpson, mayor of Mobile, Alabama since 2013
 Charles R. Stimpson, U.S. Navy fighter ace
 Jodie Stimpson, a British professional triathlete
 Tim Stimpson, rugby player
 John Stimpson, tennis player
 William Stimpson, scientist

As a given name: 
Stimpy, a fictional cat, whose full name is "Stimpson J. Cat"